The 1961 UMass Redmen football team represented the University of Massachusetts Amherst in the 1961 NCAA College Division football season as a member of the Yankee Conference. The team was coached by Vic Fusia and played its home games at Alumni Field in Amherst, Massachusetts. The 1961 season was Fusia's first as coach of the Redmen. UMass finished the season with a record of 5–4 overall and 3–1 in conference play.

Schedule

References

UMass
UMass Minutemen football seasons
UMass Redmen football